"Abel" Antonio Pujol Jiménez (b. Chalco de Díaz Covarrubias, April 13, 1913 – d. Mexico City, September 22, 1995) was a Mexican painter and printmaker.

Biography 
Pujol was born as son of Antonio Pujol Martorell, a farmer who came from Andratx, and of his Mexican wife Dolores Jiménez. In 1929 he moved to Mexico City, where he studied at the Escuela Nacional de Bellas Artes. In 1933 he became a member of the Liga de Escritores y Artistas Revolucionarios. Together with 
Pablo O'Higgins, Miguel Tzab, Marion and Grace Greenwood, he painted his first Murals at the Abelardo Rodríguez market in Mexico City. After he participated in the first Panamerican artist's congress against war and fascism in New York City, he stood there together with David Alfaro Siqueiros, Luis Arenal and Roberto Berdecio for a while after 1936, and they organized an experimental art workshop. During the Spanish Civil War, he joined the International Brigades in 1937. After his return to Mexico, he participated in the Taller de Gráfica Popular and painted a mural at the Sindicato de Trabajadores Electricistas building in 1939, together with Alfaro Siqueiros, Luis Arenal and José respectively Josep Renau Berenguer.  When he moved to Montevideo in 1940, he met his wife Ada Canabe Nalerio. They returned to Mexico in 1960. Three years later, his father died.
Abel was not his real name because that was an alias that he adopted during the time he lived in Montevideo under the name of Abel Beltrán Bastar.

Further works 
 "Los alimentos y los problemas del obrero", mural in Mexico City (1934–1935)
 "Fray Servando y Javier Mina"
 Still Life with Clock, 1930s. lithograph, Davis Museum and Cultural Center
 "Niño Campesino", lithograph
 Decoration works at the Teatro Cívico Alvaro Obregón, since 1935 Teatro del Pueblo

References 

20th-century Mexican painters
Mexican male painters
Mexican engravers
Mexican muralists
Mexican people of the Spanish Civil War
Mexican people of Spanish descent
Artists from Mexico City
Artists from the State of Mexico
1913 births
1995 deaths
20th-century engravers
International Brigades personnel
20th-century Mexican male artists